The 1981 Toray Sillook Open was a women's singles tennis tournament played on indoor carpet courts at Yoyogi National Gymnasium in Tokyo in Japan. The event was part of the Category 3 of the 1981 Toyota Series. It was the ninth edition of the tournament and was held from 14 September through 20 September 1981. Unseeded Ann Kiyomura won the title and earned $34,000 first-prize money.

Finals

Singles
 Ann Kiyomura defeated  Bettina Bunge 6–4, 7–5
It was Kiyomura's 2nd singles title of the year and of her career.

Prize money

Notes

References

Toray Sillook Open
Pan Pacific Open
Toray Sillook Open
Toray Sillook Open
Toray Sillook Open
Toray Sillook Open